Gawler Eagles FC provides organised soccer games for boys and girls, men and women from 5 years to over 50 years old, and is affiliated with Football South Australia.

The club proudly represents the Gawler community in the colours of royal blue and yellow. Games are played home/away on Saturdays and Sundays. Home games are at Karbeethan Reserve in Evanston Gardens, a few minutes West from Gawler.

History

The Gawler Soccer & Sports Club was admitted to the Elizabeth & Districts Junior Soccer Association in 1978 as the Evanston Junior Soccer Club (EJSC). Seven teams were entered that year. The Club colours were brown & gold shirts, gold shorts and socks. The home ground was originally Argana Park, Elizabeth Downs with training at Evanston Primary School and Gawler High School.

Sam Debono, one of the founding members of the Club, became the Club's first Life Member in 1985; in 1998 Sam received a special award for twenty years service to the Club.

The EJSC became incorporated in 1981. After successful discussions with the Gawler Soccer Club, a senior men's club in the SAASL, both clubs amalgamated in 1982 forming the Gawler Soccer & Sports Club Inc (GSSC). However, this partnership was short lived and was dissolved in 1984, with the juniors retaining the GSSC name. The following year the GSSC moved to Karbeethan Reserve, Evanston Gardens and this became the Club's home ground.

In 1988 the GSSC entered men's teams (A/B grades) in the SAASL (Division 9). Floodlights were installed in 1989 and Clubrooms were completed a year later. That year (1990) also saw Helen Agius become the Club's first woman President.

1992 the Club fielded its first Women's team in the SAWSA. Quite a few of these players continue to be selected each year to represent the State.

The Club adopted the nickname 'Gawler Eagles' in 1993 and commenced the first of several discussions with Gawler Council regarding change rooms.

The junior Club colours were changed to gold & blue shirts with blue shorts and socks in 1994 to match the seniors due to the unavailability of Brown/Gold shirts. That year Kristy Moore from the women's team was selected for the Australian soccer squad.

The first of many soccer skills schools was introduced in 1995.

The Karbeethan Reserve Steering Committee, a joint venture of the GSSC, Riverside Cricket Club, Gawler Hockey Club and the Gawler Softball Association was formed in 1996 to put further pressure on the Gawler Council to upgrade the existing clubrooms at the Reserve.

1999 saw the GSSC enter a team (Colts) for the first time in the SA Soccer Federation Junior Premier League. Also that year Trinity College 'amalgamated' with the GSSC.

The Club entered the computer age in 2000 with its own Website and email address. The Club also hosted the inaugural South Australian Will Coerver Coaching Clinic, an internationally acclaimed coaching method for children. This year also saw Terry Smith, who played his formative years at Gawler in the juniors up to Under-13, selected for the Joeys (Under-17) World Cup Squad.

Club jackets, with sponsors for individual teams were introduced in 2001. These very distinctive jackets established our identity within the community. The Club in conjunction with the hockey club and softball association received a grant of $95,000 from the Department of Recreation & Sport towards the building of new clubrooms.

2002 marked the Twenty-fifth Anniversary of the Club and will go down in history as the Club's most successful year: three Junior League Championships (two undefeated), two Challenge Cup Winners (three finalists) and the Senior Men being promoted to Division 4. Club caps and a commemorative port were introduced to mark the 25th Anniversary.

In 2003 the Club again entered teams in the SASF competition (U-13 & U-14) with the U-13 coming Runners Up. The Karbeethan Sporting Association was formed to manage the administration of the reserve when the new facilities are completed.

In October 2004, the new Clubrooms with change rooms were opened. The Club also received a grant from the Department of Recreation & Sport to install floodlights on the main pitch. The Men's A grade, after coming Runnerrs' Up for many years, finally won their first League trophy since their formation in 1988 (Division 4).

The Club received another grant from the Department of Recreation & Sport in 2005 to install further floodlights on the Angle Road pitch. In October, the Club hosted the United Clubs SA (formerly SASF) Junior State Championships and from the embarrassingly infinite number of plaudits that were received, the event was a huge success. The Club certainly 'raised the bar' for any future hosts of this event. The following month the Club hosted the Refugee Soccer Carnival where many teams of various ethnic origins took part in another successful event.

2006 saw the Club enter teams in the Football Federation SA State League, with the main pitch now being fenced. This meant the Club was now represented in 5 soccer competitions: Elizabeth & Districts Junior Soccer Association, SA Amateur Soccer League, SA Women's Soccer Association, Football Federation SA and the FFSA Junior Premier League.

2007 saw the Club enter two girls only teams in the SAWSA Junior competition. Work began on erecting a player's race and renovations to the old Clubrooms to convert into a referee's room were also started. With Labor winning the federal election the Club received a $200,000 grant to upgrade the lighting to enable night games to be played. The Club finally became a licensed venue in 2008.

2009 The Women's FFSA side almost did the double winning the Division 1 league and coming runners-up in the Cup while their coach. Calvin Gilmore, was awarded the Division 1 Coach of the Year by FFSA. The Under-16 FFSA team travelled to Queensland to participate in the Gold Coast Champions Cup, an international competition featuring teams from Australia, New Zealand, Asia, Europe and North and South America. The lads did the Club proud only missing out the semi-finals by 1 goal difference against larger clubs with a greater pool of players to pick from.

The next several years saw the club's fortunes flounder as it languished at the bottom end of the table. By now players numbers fell away and the club focused on the FFSA affiliation only. Despite this period of poor form on-field, the club was able to produce some remarkable talent, notably Riley McGree, Ben Warland and Lachlan Brook from its junior ranks. At the start of the 2016 season the FFSA split the State League into two divisions, Gawler placed in State League 2. This provided some respite and the club played off in its first finals campaign. Although success eluded the Eagles against Adelaide Hills it was a step in the right direction. Striker Armstrong Gaye awarded the Golden Boot was another highlight for the 2016 season. The Club's women's and girls' teams were also a shining light with the women's teams winning a flag in 2016 and runners-up in 2018 and the Under 17 girls crowned division champions in 2017.

However at the end of another disappointing season in 2017 things came to a head. Faced with massive debt and off-field issues, a new committee was formed, a new constitution adopted, a new name, "Gawler Eagles FC", replaced the old moniker, and the club's logo was updated. Earl Pudler, recently appointed senior coach by the previous committee, agreed to stay on for the rest of 2018. The Club was now focused on steadying the ship. The administration of the club was brought up to speed and the playing group was tested by the new regime. The Club finished the season in 9th place out of 12, Earl Pudler announced his departure and a number of senior players followed.

The Club was treading uncertain waters at the start of pre-season the following year and worked hard to attract players and coaching staff wanting to represent Gawler for the right reasons. Well-known soccer identity Charlie Villani was appointed senior coach. Pre-season was attended by just a handful of players at its first session. The Club worked hard to build numbers, sponsorship increased, star striker Iradi Baragomwa returned "home" and made captain and players returned to the club. Despite the challenges the playing group clicked and by mid-season Gawler found itself at the top end of the ladder. By June senior coach Charlie Villani announced his retirement citing personal reasons and assistant coach Mike Cawood took the helm steering the senior team to the finals. Remarkably the club finished in second spot on the State League 2 ladder. Its finals campaign kicked off against Adelaide Hills Hawks both home and away. Two straight losses saw the club face Adelaide Vipers in the play-off for the grand final and promotion. Despite being so close, the club suffered a 0 – 1 defeat at home and its solid season came to a close, Vipers joining Adelaide Hills in promotion to State League 1.

At the very least the club knew it was heading in the right direction. The 2020 pre-season saw an influx of players vying for a seniors spot amid renewed enthusiasm. Benny Kovadio and Zac Vannucci headed the list of inclusions. The club got off to a great start under Mike Cawood, enjoying top-of-the-table before the COVID pandemic struck and the season was put on hold for nearly three months.

Notable former players

  Kristy Moore
  Riley McGree
  Pacifique Niyongabire
  Ben Warland
  Lachlan Brook

Football South Australia – State League 2

Gawler Eagles FC Honour Board

* Denotes Golden Boot Award

Gawler Eagles FC Table Positions

Notes:
 State League divided into State League 1 and State League 2 in 2016

External links
 Official Website
 Facebook Page

Soccer clubs in Adelaide
Soccer clubs in South Australia
Association football clubs established in 1978
1978 establishments in Australia